Wilson's Arch is the modern name for an ancient stone arch from Jerusalem, the first in a row of arches that supported a large bridge connecting the Herodian Temple Mount with the Upper City on the opposite Western Hill. The Arch springs from the Western Wall and is still visible underneath later buildings set against the Wall. The name Wilson's Arch is also used to denote the hall that it partially covers, which is currently used as a synagogue. This hall opens towards the Western Wall Plaza at the Plaza's northeast corner, so that it appears on the left of the prayer section of the Western Wall to visitors facing the Wall.

The Arch once spanned , supporting a bridge that carried both a street and an aqueduct. Excavations between 2015 and 2019 collected organic material in the mortar used during various stages of construction. Radiocarbon dating indicated that the initial bridge to the Temple Mount was completed between 20 BCE and 20 CE, and a doubling in width occurred between 30 CE and 60 CE. The ground level during the Second Temple period was lower by some 3 meters than its height during the period of the Early Arab conquest. Today the original stones of the arch lie within the fillings at a depth of about 8 meters below the contemporary paved level. This arch once served as a bridge over a stone-paved street that passed beneath it, similar to Robinson's Arch. The older bridge (no longer extant) is thought to have allowed access to a gate that was level with the surface of the Temple Mount during the late Second Temple period.

Name

In the description of the survey he made at the site, Charles Wilson wrote about "[t]he arch, which Sir Henry James has called after my name.

Location
The Arch is located below the Street of the Chain leading to the Chain Gate of the Temple Mount. It connects to the Western Wall to the east and can be accessed by men from the Western Wall Plaza and by women from inside adjacent buildings.

Purpose
Wilson's Arch was built as part of a bridge described by Josephus that connected the Temple Mount to the Upper City on the Western Hill; it carried a road as well as the last section of an aqueduct bringing water from Solomon's Pools near Bethlehem to the Temple Mount.

Date
A distinction must be made between the remains of the first arch of the bridge, known as Wilson's Arch, and those of the rest of the bridge and possible later additions to it.

Absolute date
Excavations between 2015 and 2019 collected organic material in the mortar used during various stages of construction. Radiocarbon dating indicated that the initial bridge to the Temple Mount was completed between 20 BCE and 20 CE, and a doubling in width occurred between 30 CE and 60 CE. The 2020 study concluded that Wilson's Arch was initiated by Herod the Great, and enlarged during the Roman Procurators, such as Pontius Pilate, in a range of 70 years.

Structural correlations and relative date
Stinespring argued already in the 1960s that the Arch is still preserved in his original Herodian form, based on the way it is bonded to the retaining wall of the Temple Mount, which indicates that it is "a definitive part of the ancient Temple structure."

The fact that Roman theater-like structure which was discovered right underneath the arch was never finished, due to the outbreak of the Bar Kokhba Revolt or the death of the Emperor Hadrian in 138 CE, gives the terminus ante quem the Arch was built.

The oldest of the pools beneath the arch was dated to 1305–1340 CE.

Alternative theory: Umayyad date
There are scholars who have favored dating the Arch's construction to the Umayyad period (651–750), basing their conclusions on what they see as evidence from the period of excavation after the Six-Day War, when Israel's Ministry of Religious Affairs began to excavate the area of the Western Wall still unexposed, and dig a tunnel beneath the existing structures above. During much of the time of these excavations, which went on between 1968–82 and was restarted in 1985, the Israel Antiquities Authority's (IAA) District Archeologist for Jerusalem was Dan Bahat, who became the archaeologist of the site after resigning from IAA. In his book, Jerusalem Down Under: Tunneling Along Herod's Temple Mount Wall, he writes that the evidence found was enough to convince him that despite earlier beliefs that the Arch was built during Herod's time, the later dating is correct.

It is believed by those who date the current arch to the later period, that it was a replacement for an earlier arch erected during the Second Temple period, and that the Umayyads didn't just restore the retaining walls surrounding the Mount, but also rebuilt the arches of the "Great Bridge".

Dimensions
Only a  portion of the Arch is visible today.

A square shaft cut down under the arch allows sighting of the wall's original massive foundations, "with fourteen courses of dressed stone below the present ground level."

The exact dimensions of the Second Temple period bridge which stood over the arch are impossible to determine.

Discovery and excavation

Titus Tobler noted the structure and wrote in 1853 that "I regard the vaults as supporting arches for the path or bridge that leads from Suk Bab es-Sinsleh to Bab es-Sinsleh". The arch was scientifically documented for the first time in 1865 by explorer and surveyor Charles Wilson, for whom it was named. Wilson had joined the Ordnance Survey of Jerusalem in 1864, continuing to participate in the city surveying project that was established to improve the city's water system. Not long after Wilson, Charles Warren excavated under the arch by digging two trial shafts, one along the western pier all the way down to bedrock. He published his discoveries in 1876.

In 1968, only a few months after the Six-Day War, Israel began excavations to uncover the portion of the Western Wall that was not exposed. As the excavations continued, the opening to the arch was uncovered, and rubble began to be removed. It would take 17 years, until 1985, until the entire length of the wall would be cleared.

The space under the arch was fitted out after 1967 as a synagogue, with a new floor built over the floor of a large Mamluk-Ottoman water reservoir, called by Warren 'Pool Al Burak'. The presence of the synagogue restricted further excavation under Wilson's Arch to a large degree, with limited digs being carried out in 2006 and 2011, followed by a substantial dig between 2015 and 2018 over a 200 m³ total area. This large project focused on dating the arch and, after exposing a theatre-like structure directly beneath it, the date and function of this unexpected finding.

Associated structures

Herodian "Western Stone"
The Western Stone, located in the north section of the Arch, is a monolithic stone block forming part of the lower level of the Western Wall. Weighing 570 tonnes (628 tons), it is one of the largest building blocks in the world. It is considered to be one of the heaviest objects ever lifted by human beings without powered machines. It is the largest building stone found in Israel and second in the world. It is only partially intact, the rest was destroyed in 70 CE during the Roman siege of Jerusalem.

Roman theater-like structure
A small Roman theater-like structure was discovered directly below the Arch. The theater was never finished, this being possibly the result of the Bar Kokhba Revolt or the death of Emperor Hadrian (r. 117–138).

Mamluk-Ottoman "Al-Buraq" Pool
The modern synagogue under the arch covers the Mamluk-Ottoman cistern known in the time of Wilson and Warren as the 'Pool Al Burak'.

Makhkama building

Over the prayer hall area partially covered by the Arch is the large building known as the Makhkama or Tankiziyya, that includes a porch looking over the Temple Mount. Former Chief Rabbi Shlomo Goren used to use that porch to recite special "Kinot" prayers on the night of Tisha B'Av.

Modern synagogue
After the 1967 Six-Day War, the space under the arch was transformed into a synagogue.

In 2005, the Western Wall Heritage Foundation initiated a major renovation effort under Rabbi Rabinovich, then-rabbi of the wall ("Rabbi of the Kotel", as the title is usually referenced, using the Hebrew word for the Wall). Israeli workers renovated and restored the area for three years, strengthening the arch in preparation for access for visitors and use for prayer. Scaffolding remained in place for over a year to allow workers to remove cement that had been applied as patches over the stone. The restoration included additions to the men's section included a Torah ark that can house over one hundred Torah scrolls, in addition to new bookshelves, a library, and heating for the winter and air conditioning for the summer. There is also a new room built for the scribes who maintain and preserve the Torah scrolls used at the Wall.
 Speakers at the March 12, 2006 dedication ceremony included: President of Israel, Mr. Moshe Katzav, Ashkenazi and Sephardi chief rabbis, Rabbi Yona Metzger and Rabbi Shlomo Amar, the mayor of Jerusalem, Rabbi Uri Lupolianski, the chief rabbi of the Kotel, Rabbi Rabinovich, and the director of The Western Wall Heritage Foundation, Rabbi Mordechai (Suli) Eliav.

New construction also included a women's section and gallery, which was dedicated on May 25, 2006, a little more than two months after the March dedication ceremony. This addition creates a woman's section to allow separate seating during worship services and special events conducted within the Wilson's Arch prayer area, including Bar Mitzvah ceremonies, and advertisements for special programs such as the middle-of-the-night prayers climaxing the six-week "Shovavim" period have made a point of reminding women that this new area exists. According to the Western Wall Heritage Foundation, this new construction allows women for the first time to "take part in the services held inside under the Arch." On May 14, 2008, United States First Lady Laura Bush visited the new women's section during her visit to Israel.

On July 25, 2010, a Ner Tamid, an oil-burning "eternal light," was installed within the prayer hall within Wilson's Arch, the first eternal light installed in the area of the Western Wall. According to the Western Wall Heritage Foundation, requests have been made for many years that "an olive oil lamp be placed in the prayer hall of the Western Wall Plaza, as is the custom in Jewish synagogues, to represent the menorah of the Temple in Jerusalem as well as the continuously burning fire on the altar of burnt offerings in front of the Temple, especially in the closest place to where they used to stand."

Special events

In 1983, a highly unusual interfaith service was conducted in the area under Wilson's Arch—the first interfaith service ever to be conducted at the Western Wall since it came under Israeli control. Attended by both men and women who were allowed to sit together, it was conducted under the supervision of the Israel Ministry of Religious Affairs, and led by U.S. Navy Chaplain (Rabbi) Arnold Resnicoff. Ministry of Affairs representative Yonatan Yuval was present, responding to press queries that this service was authorized as part of a special welcome for the U.S. Sixth Fleet.

Since the restoration, a growing number of worship events have been scheduled in the area, to take advantage of the cover and temperature control, especially for services at night that are traditionally recited at the Wall. For example, "Tikkun Chatzot," a kabbalistic midnight prayer for redemption has been conducted there, with a number of public figures in attendance.

The area has also been utilized during times when security concerns make it difficult to allow the use of the outdoor prayer plaza, such as the March 19, 2009 visit of Pope Benedict XVI to the Wall and Temple Mount. Despite the fact that the Pope's visit coincided with the Jewish festival of Lag B'Omer, the decision had been made to close the Wall and not allow services, but at the request of the Wall's rabbi, Shmuel Rabinowitz, the government allowed worship to be conducted in the area within the Arch. The original decision to close the entire prayer area to Jewish worship had begun to elicit negative reaction as soon as the decision was announced, between one and two months before the visit. Rabbi Rabinowitz, protesting the decision, was quoted as saying that "It's inconceivable that the pope's visit would hurt worshippers at the Western Wall, some of whom have been praying there daily." Part of the reaction was a threat to assemble and protest on the part of some Israelis, saying the police would have to "drag" them out of the area. News articles quoted one comment that, "Just like the visit of a chief rabbi at the Vatican doesn't cause the Vatican to shut down, we expect the same approach when the pope visits a place holy to the Jewish people." The decision to utilize the prayer area within Wilson's Arch, allowing worship during the Pope's visit, was eventually announced by the Israel Police and the Israel Security Agency (ISA/Shin Bet). Worshippers were allowed into the main plaza during the hours prior to the Pope's scheduled arrival, but moved into the enclosed Wilson's Arch prayer before his actual arrival.

Video and audio streaming of some special events are available online from the "Wilson's Arch camera" (webcam). It does not operate on Shabbat, the Jewish Sabbath, or on those Jewish holy days when photography is prohibited by Jewish religious law.

See also

Excavations at the Temple Mount
Herod's Temple
Jerusalem during the Second Temple Period
Robinson's Arch
Western Wall Tunnel

References

Bibliography

External links

 Photos: Wilson's Arch today and photographic renderings of its original form.
 Modern photos.
 Wilson's Arch photo gallery, Western Hall Heritage Foundation.
 Wilson's Arch, identified on map/diagram of old city.
 Map of ancient water route, including Wilson's Arch aqueduct.
 19th Century Charles Warren and Charles Wilson Jerusalem maps.
 Wilson's Arch live webcam.
 The Jerusalem Archaeological Park
 Charles Wilson's 1886 "Ordnance Survey of Jerusalem"
 YouTube Video: Western Stone (Hebrew, with some English written translation)

Jews and Judaism in the Roman Empire
Archaeological artifacts
Buildings and structures in Jerusalem
Shrines in Jerusalem
Synagogues in Jerusalem
Tabernacle and Temples in Jerusalem
Temple Mount
Wilsons Arch